Tony David (born 11 September 1967) is an Australian former professional darts player, who played under the nickname The Deadly Boomerang. He is the only Australian player to have been a senior singles world darts champion, having won the 2002 Embassy World Championship.

Career
David started playing darts at the age of 25 and progressed into the Queensland State team in 1995. Four years later, he made the Australian WDF World Cup team for the first time.

He made his first trip to the Lakeside Country Club in 2001 to play in the Embassy World Championship, losing to Andy Fordham 0–3 in the first round.

The following year, in 2002, he qualified for his second attempt at the World Championship. Despite being a 66/1 outsider before the tournament began, he went all the way to the final, beating Ritchie Davies, Marko Pusa, Bob Taylor before winning a tight semi-final against Martin Adams 5–4. He was the slight favourite for the title going into the final due to his results, and went on to beat Mervyn King 6–4 in the final. He became the first Australian player to win a World Professional Darts Championship.

Later in 2002, he won the World Darts Trophy in the Netherlands, one of the British Darts Organisation's other Grand Slam titles. Also in 2002, David won the Australian Grand Masters and the Doeland Grand Masters to cap off a superb year. David also reached the semi-finals of the World Darts Trophy in 2003 and 2004, losing both times to Raymond van Barneveld. David also lost to Barneveld in the final of the International Darts League in 2004.

David went into the 2003 World Championship at the Lakeside as the number 1 seed and pre-tournament favourite after his 2002 successes. The defence of his world title started creditably as he defeated Brian Sorensen and Vincent van der Voort in his first two matches, but ended with a surprising 0–5 loss at the quarter-final stage to Ritchie Davies of Wales. After that defeat, David has failed to win another match at the Lakeside event. He went out in the first round in 2004 to Darryl Fitton and in 2005 to Tony Eccles. He failed to qualify for the 2006 or 2007 events. He returned to Lakeside in 2008 but lost in the first round to Gary Robson.

In February 2005, David was one of the four BDO players who competed at the prestigious 2005 Masters of Darts, against four PDC players. Of the four matches that David played at the event, he won 2 and lost 2. He defeated Wayne Mardle 4–2 in sets in his opening match, lost 0–4 in sets to reigning PDC World Champion Phil Taylor in his second match, lost 3–4 in sets to reigning UK Open champion Roland Scholten in his third match, and then won his fourth match against the reigning World Grand Prix champion, Colin Lloyd, by 4–3 in sets. Despite his two victories, David failed to progress to the semi finals, with Andy Fordham and Raymond van Barneveld progressing to the semi finals from the BDO group, as David was eliminated. Phil Taylor eventually won the tournament.

Health problems
David has haemophilia, which requires regular medication. On top of this, his throwing action is slightly limited by the condition, as he cannot bring his arm back as far as most players due to bleeding in his elbow during childhood causing crystallization in the elbow.

On 21 February 2009, David was rushed to hospital to undergo an emergency liver transplant due to complications with interferon/ribuviron treatment. The transplant was a successful one, and David has recovered well, although he has been unable to fully return to darts.

On 7 December , David was rushed into hospital for an operation on his spleen. The operation was deemed to be a success. David's close friend Allan Summers said on BDOforums.co.uk that he is "improving day by day from his latest operation; however, it would be some time before he would be allowed back home to continue his ongoing treatment".

Personal life
David married his long-time partner, Natalie Carter, on 20 November 2010. They divorced in March 2018.

World Championship Results

BDO
 2001: 1st round (lost to Andy Fordham 0–3)
 2002: Winner (beat Mervyn King 6–4)
 2003: Quarter-final (lost to Ritchie Davies 0–5)
 2004: 1st round (lost to Darryl Fitton 2–3)
 2005: 1st round (lost to Tony Eccles 2–3)
 2008: 1st round (lost to Gary Robson 1–3)

Career finals

BDO major finals: 4 (3 titles, 1 runner-up)

Performance timeline

References

External links
 Stats from Darts Database

1967 births
Australian darts players
Living people
BDO world darts champions
People from Townsville
British Darts Organisation players